Mayuge is a town in the Eastern Region of Uganda. It is the location of the headquarters of Mayuge District.

Location

Neighboring communities include Bugadi, Bukanya, Bugoto, Wandegeya, Bemba, Namalege, Musita, and Ikulwe. The geographical coordinates of Mayuge are 0°27'28.0"N, 33°28'48.0"E (Latitude:0.457782; Longitude:33.480003).

Overview
Mayuge is a small rural settlement that is in the process of becoming an urban center. Mayuge is the only municipality in Mayuge District. Sanitation was one of the major challenges that the town faced in 2010.

Population
In 2002, the national census estimated Mayuge's population at about 8,720. In 2010, the Uganda Bureau of Statistics (UBOS) estimated the population at 11,500. In 2011, UBOS estimated the population at 11,900. On 27 August 2014, the national population census put the population at 17,151.

Economic activity
The economic activity in the town revolves mainly around subsistence agriculture, poultry farming, and animal husbandry.

Energy
Mayuge is the location of Mayuge Solar Power Station, a 10 megawatts solar PV installation that supplies power to the Uganda electricity national grid. The solar farm was commissioned in June 2019.

See also
 Busoga sub-region
 List of cities and towns in Uganda

References

External links
 Mayuge Town Council Risks Cholera Outbreak

Populated places in Eastern Region, Uganda
Cities in the Great Rift Valley
Populated places on Lake Victoria
Mayuge District